The 1963 Michigan Wolverines football team was an American football team that represented the University of Michigan in the 1963 Big Ten Conference football season.  In its fifth year under head coach Bump Elliott, Michigan compiled a 3–4–2 record (2–3–2 against conference opponents), tied for fifth place in the Big Ten, and outscored opponents by a total of 131 to 127. The highlight of the season was an upset victory over No. 2 Illinois led by Dick Butkus, the only loss suffered by the 1963 Illinois team.

Left guard Joe O'Donnell was the team captain, and was selected by the Associated Press as a first-team guard on the 1963 All-Big Ten Conference football team. Left tackle Tom Keating received the team's most valuable player award, and was selected as a first-team All-Big Ten player by the United Press International.

The team's statistical leaders included Bob Timberlake with 593 passing yards, Mel Anthony with 394 rushing yards and 30 points scored, and John Henderson with 330 receiving yards.

Schedule

Season summary

Preseason
The 1962 Michigan Wolverines football team compiled a 2–7 record and was outscored, 214 to 70. At the end of the 1962 season, Joe O'Donnell was elected by his teammates to be captain of the 1963 team. Several starters from the 1962 returned in 1963, including O'Donnell, Tom Keating, and Bob Timberlake.

In May 1963, Tom Keating received the Meyer W. Morton Trophy as the team's most improved player in spring drills. Dick Sygar received the John Maulbetsch Award.

SMU

    
    
    
    
    
    

On September 28, Michigan opened its season with a 27–16 victory over Hayden Fry's SMU before a Band Day crowd of 63,659 (including 13,000 high school band members) at Michigan Stadium in Ann Arbor, Michigan. After a scoreless first quarter, Michigan scored three touchdowns in the second quarter (including a 98-yard touchdown drive following a fumble recovery by Brian Patshen and a 50-yard touchdown run by Joe O'Donnell on a fake punt) and led 27–0 at the end of the third quarter. All of SMU's points were scored in the final six-and-a-half minutes. Bob Timberlake kicked three extra points, but was unable to start at quarterback due to a shoulder injury; Frosty Evashevski (son of Forest Evashevski) played at the quarterback position in Timberlake's place.

Navy

    
    
    
    
    
    

On October 5, Michigan lost to Navy by a 26–13 score before a crowd of 55,877 at Michigan Stadium. Navy, led by junior quarterback Roger Staubach, was ranked No. 6 in the AP poll. Staubach broke his own Navy single-game record with 307 yards of total offense. He completed 14 of 16 passes for 237 yards and two touchdowns and ran for 70 yards and one touchdown. Michigan quarterback Bob Timberlake was again sidelined; Frosty Evashevski started in his place, and Bob Chandler took over in the second half. Chandler completed nine of ten passes for 138 yards and two touchdowns in a comeback that fell short.

Michigan State

    
    

On October 12, Michigan played to a 7–7 tie with Michigan State in their annual rivalry game. The game was played before a crowd of 101,450 at Michigan Stadium. Michigan took the lead in the first quarter on a 15-yard pass from quarterback Bob Chandler to split end John Henderson.  Michigan's scoring drive began with a 26-yard punt return by Jack Clancy. The Spartans tied it up late in the third quarter on a seven-yard touchdown pass from Steve Juday to Sherman Lewis.

Purdue

    
    
    
    
    
    

On October 19, Michigan lost to Purdue by a 23–12 score before a small crowd of 45,557 at Michigan Stadium. Purdue took advantage of two Michigan fumbles to take a 14–0 lead in the first quarter. The Boilermakers extended their lead to 23-0 with field goal in the third quarter and another touchdown early in the fourth quarter.

Bob Chandler started the game at quarterback, but was replaced after he fumbled on a fourth-down play at Michigan's 26-yard line.  Chandler was then replaced by Frosty Evashevski, but Evashevski also turned the ball over on a misdirected pitchout. Late in the third quarter, Bob Timberlake came off the bench to take over at quarterback. He had been selected as the team's starting quarterback before the season, but a shoulder injury relegated him to kickoffs and field goals in the team's first three games. In his return to the quarterback spot, Timberlake completed 10 of 16 passes for 133 yards. He also scored two touchdowns in the fourth quarter – first on a one-yard run and 71 seconds later on a 14-yard run.

Tom Cecchini suffered a knee injury in the game that caused him to lose the remainder of the season.

at Minnesota

    

On October 26, Michigan lost the annual Little Brown Jug game to Minnesota by a 6–0 score before a homecoming crowd of 62,107 at Memorial Stadium in Minneapolis. The only points of the game were scored by Minnesota's 152-pound halfback Jerry Pelletier on a six-yard run in the second quarter. The kick for extra point failed. Michigan was unable to score on two drives inside Minnesota's 10-yard line and on another to the 17-yard line. Quarterback Bob Timberlake also missed a field goal from the 15-yard line. Timberlake completed 14 passes for 90 yards, and Mel Anthony rushed for 82 yards on 18 carries. Minnesota out-gained Michigan by 202 yards (157 rushing, 45 passing) to 195 yards (105 rushing, 90 passing).

Northwestern

    
    
    
    
    

On November 2, Michigan defeated Northwestern by a 27 to 6 score before a homecoming crowd of 51,088 at Michigan Stadium. Michigan quarterback Bob Timberlake completed 12 of 20 passes for 196 yards, threw three touchdown passes, and kicked three extra points. John Henderson scored two of the Wolverines' touchdowns, one on a 24-yard touchdown pass from Timberlake and the other on 23-yard interception return. Dave Cyranowski scored Northwestern's lone touchdown with six seconds remaining.

at Illinois

    
    
    

On November 9, Michigan upset undefeated Illinois by a 14 to 8 score before a crowd of 55,810 at Memorial Stadium in Champaign, Illinois. Illinois, led by All-American center/linebacker Dick Butkus and fullback Jim Grabowski, was ranked No. 2 in the AP poll prior to the game. The Wolverines, on the other hand, were unranked and arrived at the game with a 1–2–1 conference record. The game was the sixth straight victory for Bump Elliott against his brother, Pete Elliott, head coach of Illinois since 1960.  The Elliott brothers played together in the backfield of Michigan's undefeated 1947 "Mad Magicians" team.

Late in the first quarter and early in the second, Bob Timberlake and Dick Rindfuss led a 56-yard touchdown drive capped by a three-yard run by Rindfuss.

Later in the second half, an Illinois drive was halted when freshman defensive back John Rowser (who later played 10 seasons in the NFL) interrupted a pass at the Michigan 10-yard line and returned it to the 20. On the last play of the first half, Rowser also broke up a pass from Mike Taliaferro to Ron Fearn at the Michigan five-yard line.

In the third quarter, a 65-yard line-drive punt by Michigan captain Joe O'Donnell rolled dead at the Illinois eight-yard line. From there, Illinois drove 92 yards in 16 plays, including a 20-yard run by Grabowski. The Illini scored their only touchdown on a one-yard run by backup fullback Al Wheatland. Rather than kick the extra point, Illinois went for two points. Taliaferro rolled out to the left side, faked a pass, and ran for the two-point conversion.  Illinois led, 8–7.

With six minutes remaining in the game, Illinois back Jim Warren fumbled on a pitch from quarterback Mike Taliaferro. Rowser recovered the loose ball on the Illinois 11-yard line. Michigan scored the winning touchdown five plays later on a one-yard plunge by fullback Mel Anthony.

Late in the game, Rowser halted yet another Illinois drive by recovering another fumble—his third turnover of the game. The game was largely a defensive battle, as Illinois out-gained Michigan in total yards by a margin of 295 to 154. Timberlake completed only seven of 22 passes and gave up two interceptions. Rindfuss was Michigan's leading rusher with a total of only 35 yards on 13 carries.

Iowa

    
    
    
    
    
    

On November 16, Michigan tied with Iowa, 21–21, before a crowd of 46,582 at Michigan Stadium.

On its second drive, Iowa advanced the ball to Michigan's two-yard line on a 49-yard reception by Paul Krause.  OnMel Anthony scored all three Michigan touchdowns on runs of 13 yards, one yard, and one yard. For Iowa, Gary Snook was responsible for all three Hawkeye touchdowns on a 14-yard run and touchdown passes to Cloyd Webb and Paul Krause. The drive was halted when Gary Snook fumbled and Tom Keating recovered the ball. Michigan then drove 94 yards for a touchdown on a 13-yard run by Mel Anthony to take a 7–0 lead.

Iowa took the lead with two touchdowns (scored within four minutes of the other) in the second quarter. Snook ran 13 yards for the first and passed 12 yards to Cloyd Webb for the second. Shortly before halftime, Michigan back Dick Rindfuss fumbled at Iowa's four-yard line. 

At the start of the third quarter, Michigan drove 59 yards for a touchdown. Mel Anthony scored on a one-yard dive over the left tackle. Bob Timberlake's pass for a two-point conversion was knocked down in the end zone. Midway through the third quarter, Anthony ran three yards for his third touchdown of the game. This time, Timberake's pass for a two-point conversion was caught by (John Henderson.

At the end of the third quarter, Anthony fumbled with Michigan ahead, 21–14, and the Hawkeyes scored the game-tying touchdown on the  possession that followed. Timberlake missed a game-winning field goal from the 29-yard line midway through the fourth quarter, Iowa's kicker, Jay Roberts, missed one from the 35-yard line five minutes later.

Michigan rushed for 276 yards, including 137 on 24 carries by Timberlake. Timberlake's 137 yards was the highest single-game rushing total to that point in Bump Elliott's five-year tenure as head coach.  Mel Anthony added 83 rushing yards. In total yardage, Michigan out-gained the Hawkeyes by 369 yards to 366.

Ohio State

    
    
    
    

On November 30, Michigan lost its annual rivalry game to Ohio State by a 14–10 score at Michigan Stadium. The game was originally scheduled to be played on November 23. President John F. Kennedy was assassinated on November 22, and the Michigan athletic department announced that night that the game would not be postponed. On game day, the game was abruptly postponed. The game was ultimately played on the Saturday after Thanksgiving and drew a crowd of only 36,424 – the smallest crowd at Michigan Stadium since November 1958.

Michigan took a 10–0 lead in the second quarter on a 28-yard field goal by Bob Timberlake and a one-yard touchdown run by Dick Rindfuss. Ohio State narrowed Michigan's lead with a 35-yard touchdown pass from Don Unverferth to Paul Warfield later in the second quarter, but Michigan held the lead until midway through the fourth quarter. Quarterback Don Unverferth scored the game-winning touchdown on a five-yard run.

Postseason
Two Michigan players received first-team honors on the 1963 All-Big Ten Conference football team: 
 Left tackle Tom Keating received the team's most valuable player award and was selected by the United Press International as a first-team All-Big Ten player.

 Left guard and team captain Joe O'Donnell was selected by the Associated Press as a first-team All-Big Ten guard. 

Keating was also selected by his teammates as the team's most valuable player.

The 1964 NFL Draft was held on December 2, 1963. Three Michigan players were selected: 
 Joe O'Donnell was selected by the Green Bay Packers in the third round with the 40th overall pick.
 Tom Keating was selected by the Minnesota Vikings in the fourth round with the 53rd overall pick.
 Tackle John Houtman was selected by the Cleveland Browns in the 15th round with the 207th overall pick.

Statistical leaders
Michigan's individual statistical leaders for the 1963 season include those listed below.

Rushing

Passing

Receiving

Kickoff returns

Punt returns

Points scored

Personnel

Letter winners
The following player received letters for their participation on the 1963 Michigan football team. Player starting five or more games are displayed in bold.

 Dennis Alix, 6'0", 185 pounds, senior, West Bloomfield, MI - quarterback
Mel Anthony, 6'0", 202 pounds, junior, Cincinnati, OH - started 3 games at fullback
Tom Cecchini, 6'0", 195 pounds, sophomore, Detroit - started 4 games at center
 Robert Chandler, 6'3", 208 pounds, senior, LaGrange, IL - started 3 games at quarterback
 Harvey Chapman, Jr., 5'11", 177 pounds, senior, Farmington Hills, MI - halfback
Jack Clancy, 6'1", 196 pounds, sophomore, Detroit - started 9 games at left halfback 
Jim Conley, 6'3", 191 pounds, junior, Springdale, PA - started 7 games at left end 
Chuck Dehlin, 5'11", 198 pounds, sophomore, Flushing, MI - started 2 games at fullback
 William Dodd, 6'0", 204 pounds, senior Virden, IL - halfback
 Forest "Frosty" Evashevski, Jr., 6'0", 185 pounds, senior, Iowa City, IA - started 1 game at quarterback
 Ben Farabee, 6'3", 206 pounds, junior, Holland, MI - end
 James Green, 6'1", 210 pounds, junior, Trenton, MI - center
Richard Hahn, 6'0", 206 pounds, junior, Norton Village, OH - started 6 games at right guard
John Henderson, 6'3", 185 pounds, junior, Dayton, OH - started 3 games at right end
John Houtman, 6'4", 244 pounds, senior, Adrian, MI - started 1 game at right tackle
 Jeffrey Hoyne, 6'1", 197 pounds, sophomore, Chicago - end
Tom Keating, 6'3", 240 pounds, senior, Chicago - started 9 games at left tackle
 Craig Kirby, 6'1", 179 pounds, sophomore, Royal Oak, MI - started 2 games at left end
 David Kovacevich, 5'10", 215 pounds, senior, Chicago - guard
 David Kurtz, 6'0", 214 pounds, senior, Toledo, OH - guard
Bill Laskey, 6'1", 211 pounds, junior, Milan, MI - started 6 games at right end 
 Gerald Mader, 6'3", 220 pounds, junior, Chicago - tackle
John Marcum, 6'0", 208 pounds, junior, Monroe, MI - started 3 games at right guard
Joe O'Donnell, 6'2", 238 pounds, senior, Milan, MI - started 9 games at left guard
Brian Patchen, 5'11", 210 pounds, junior, Steubenville, OH - started 5 games at center
 Thomas Pritchard, 5'10", 180 pounds, senior, Marion, OH - quarterback
 Richard Ries, 6'2", 225 pounds, sophomore, Royal Oak, MI - guard
Dick Rindfuss, 6'0", 192 pounds, junior, Niles, OH - started 9 games at right halfback
 John Rowser, 6'0", 175 pounds, sophomore, Detroit - halfback
 Charles Ruzicka, 6'1", 239 pounds, sophomore, Skokie, IL - tackle
 Stephen Smith, 6'5", 228 pounds, sophomore, Park Ridge, IL - end
 R. Wayne Sparkman, 5'11", 186 pounds, senior, Plymouth, MI - started 4 games at fullback
 Richard Szymanski, 5'10", 185 pounds, senior, Toledo, OH - center
Bob Timberlake, 6'4", 211 pounds, junior, Franklin, OH - started 5 games at quarterback
 Richard Wells, 5'9", 172 pounds, sophomore, Grand Rapids, MI - halfback
 Paul Woodward, 6'2", 216 pounds, junior, Cincinnati - guard
Bill Yearby, 6'3", 223 pounds, sophomore, Detroit - started 8 games at right tackle

Freshmen
 Mike Bass, 5'11", 175 pounds, freshman, Ypsilanti, MI - halfback
 Dave Fisher, 5'10", 200 pounds, freshman, Kettering, OH - fullback
 Wally Gabler, 6'1", 185 pounds, freshman, Royal Oak, MI - quarterback
 Frank Nunley, 6'1", 220 pounds, freshman, Belleville, MI - center
 Dick Vidmer, 6'0", 180 pounds, freshman, Greensburg, PA - quarterback
 Rich Volk, 6'2", 185 pounds, freshman, Wauseon, OH - quarterback
 Carl Ward, 5'9", 180 pounds, freshman, Cincinnati - halfback
 Clayton Wilhite, 6'4", 195 pounds, freshman, Bay City, MI - end

Coaching staff
 Head coach: Bump Elliott

 Assistant coaches: 
 Don Dufek, Sr. - defensive backfield coach
 Dennis Fitzgerald - freshman coach
 Henry Fonde - offensive backfield coach
 Jack Fouts - offensive line coach
 Bob Hollway - defensive line coach
 Jack Nelson - ends coach

 Trainer: Jim Hunt
 Team physician: Dr. A. W. Coxon
 Senior manager: Gustav Schulwitz

References

External links
 1963 Football Team – Bentley Historical Library, University of Michigan Athletics History

Michigan
Michigan Wolverines football seasons
Michigan Wolverines football